Mann River may refer to:
Mann River (New South Wales), a tributary of  the Clarence River
 Mann River (Northern Territory), a tributary of the Liverpool River in central Arnhem Land, Australia
 Mann River (Maharashtra), India is a river in Buldhana district